This is a list of weapons used by the Italian Regio Esercito during the Second Italo-Ethiopian War.

Small arms

Rifles 

 Carcano

Sidearms 

 Beretta M1934
 Bodeo Model 1889

Machine guns 

 Breda 30-LMG
 Fiat–Revelli Modello 1914-MMG

Submachine guns 

 Beretta M1918
 OVP 1918

Armoured fighting vehicles (AFVs) 

 L3/33
 L3/35

Tank
 Fiat 3000

References

Lists of weapons
Weapons of Italy
Weapons
Italian military-related lists
Italo-Ethiopian